Breaking up may refer to a breakup, as in a relationship breakup.

Breaking Up may also refer to:

Books
 Breaking Up, play Nigel Williams
 Breaking Up (graphic novel), a young-adult fiction graphic novel

Film and TV
 Breaking Up (1978 film), an American TV film
 Breaking Up (1985 film), a 1985 television film
 Breaking Up (1997 film), a 1997 direct-to-video film
 Breaking Up with Shannen Doherty, a 2006 reality TV series

Music
 Breakin' Up, a song by Rilo Kiley from Under the Blacklight
 "Breaking Up" (song), a 2007 single by Eskimo Joe
 "Breakin' Up", a song by Gwen Stefani from The Sweet Escape
 "Breakin' Up", a song by Violent Femmes from New Times
"Breaking Up", a song by Charli XCX from Sucker

See also
 Break Up (disambiguation)